San Andrés is a town in Marbán Province in the Beni Department of northern Bolivia. It is the capital of San Andrés Municipality.

References

External links
Satellite map at Maplandia.com

Populated places in Beni Department